Pralhad Balacharya Gajendragadkar (16 March 1901 – 12 June 1981) originally from Gajendra-Gad, a historic fort and town in southern India was the 7th Chief Justice of India, serving from  February 1964 to  March 1966.

Early life and career
Prahlad Balacharya Gajendragadkar was born into Deshastha Madhva Brahmin family on 16 March 1901 to Gajendragadkar Balacharya in Satara, Bombay Presidency. The family of Gajendragadkar's, migrated from Gajendragad, a town in Dharwad district in Karnataka to Satara (now part of Maharashtra). Gajendragadkar's father Bal-Acharya (Teacher) was a Sanskrit Vidwan (scholar). P. B. Gajendragadkar, the youngest son of Bal-Acharya spread the fame of the family name Gajendra-Gadkar name. He followed his older brother Ashvathama-Acharys to Mumbai and carried the torch of the Gajendragadkar tradition in Nyaya (Law) to the western world. He passed M.A. from Deccan College (Pune) in 1924 and LL.B. with honors from the ILS Law College in 1926 and joined the Bombay Bar on the Appellate side. In the early days, he edited the 'Hindu Law Quarterly. His critical edition of the classic 'Dattaka Mimamsa' earned him a great reputation for scholarship. He became the acknowledged leader of the Bombay Bar, well known for his forensic skill and legal acumen. He was influenced by Jawaharlal Nehru's rationality and scholasticism.

In 1945, he was appointed a Judge of the Bombay High Court. In January 1956, he was elevated to the Supreme Court Bench and rose to become the Chief Justice of India in 1964. His contribution to the development of Constitutional and Industrial Law has been hailed as great and unique.

Gajendragadkar intervened and got the then Chief Justice of the Madras High Court S. Ramachandra Iyer to resign after a lawyer G. Vasantha Pai found evidence that he forged his date of birth to avoid compulsory retirement at the age of 60  as the case filed by Pai would severely damage the judiciary and he got Ramachandra Iyer to resign  before the case came up for hearing this led the case to be dismissed as he had  already resigned his lordship.

At the request of the Government of India, he headed a number of commissions such as the Central Law Commission, National Commission on Labour and the Bank Award Commission. At the request of Indira Gandhi, then the Prime Minister of India, he held the honorary office of the Gandhigram Rural Institute in Southern India.

He served twice as the President of Social Reform Conference and organized campaigns for eradicating the evils of casteism, untouchability, superstition and obscurantism to promote national integration and unity.

Gajendragadkar also carried forward the Madhva tradition of Vedanta and Mimasa. He served as the General Editor of 'The Ten Classical Upanishads', a series sponsored by the Bharatiya Vidya Bhavan. Like his father, Gajendragadkar was also a Mukhasta-vidwan.

Personal life

Gajendragadkar had 2 daughters, Dr. (Mrs.) Sharad Jahagirdar, a renowned gynaecologist who resided in Mumbai, and Asha Kirtane, an artist residing in Pune. His eldest daughter, Dr. (Mrs.) Sharad Jahagirdar married Justice Raghavendra Jahagirdar who served as a judge on the Bombay High Court.

Education 
 Satara High School (1911 to 1918)
 Karnatak College, Dharwar (1918–1920)
 Deccan College (Pune) (1920 to 1924)
 Dakshina Fellow (1922–24)
 Bhagwandas Purshotamdas Sanskrit Scholar (1922–24)
 ILS Law College (1924–26)

Positions held
 Judge Bombay High Court 1945–57
 Judge, Supreme Court - 1957
 Chief Justice of India from 1 February 1964. Retired on 15 March 1966
 Honorary Vice-Chancellor of the University of Mumbai (1967)

Books
 Open Library P. B. Gajendragadkar

Awards

In 1972, Gajendragadkar was awarded the Padma Vibhushan award from the Government of India.

References

Bibliography
 

1901 births
1981 deaths
Chief justices of India
Scholars from Mumbai
Marathi people
Recipients of the Padma Vibhushan in public affairs
People from Gadag-Betageri
People from Satara (city)
Judges of the Bombay High Court
20th-century Indian judges
20th-century Indian lawyers